Bells Beach is a coastal locality of Victoria, Australia in Surf Coast Shire and a renowned surf beach, located 100 km south-west of Melbourne, on the Great Ocean Road near the towns of Torquay and Jan Juc.

It is named after William Bell, a Master Mariner, who owned much of the property there from the 1840s. Many records wrongly accredit the location's name to John Calvert Bell of the family that took up a pastoral run there much later in 1905 and built the 'Addiscot' homestead. John Calvert Bell was, before that time, a resident at Calder Park, Mount Duneed, and not related to William Bell of Bells Beach.  The beach and coastal reserve are listed on the Victorian Heritage Register.

In the 2016 Census, there were 130 people in Bells Beach, 88.7% of whom were born in Australia and 94.5% of whom spoke only English at home.

Surfing
Bells Beach is the home of the world's longest continuously running pro surfing competition – now known as the Rip Curl Pro Bells Beach. The event was formerly known as the Bells Easter Classic (among a variety of other titles). The competition was first held in January 1962 and then at Easter every year since, although occasionally, when conditions at Bells aren't suitable, the competition has been transferred to other breaks such as Johanna and Woolamai.

As early as 1939, surfers from Torquay made their way to Bells but access was a considerable problem until 1960, when Torquay surfers and Olympic wrestler Joe Sweeney hired a bulldozer and cleared a road along the Bells cliff  from the Cobb & Co Road, where the concrete wave now stands, down to the beach. He charged one pound per surfer to recover his expenses. This is now part of the Surf Coast walking track.

Nearby surf breaks include "Southside", "Centreside", "Rincon", "Winki Pop", (Uppers and Lowers), "Boobs" and "Steps".  Although Bells is known internationally as one of the best breaks in Victoria, "Winki Pop" often works better under more diverse conditions than the other nearby breaks.

The first "Surfboard Rally" at Bells Beach was organised by surfing pioneers Peter Troy and Vic Tantau to help promote sales of T Boards, their own brand. Planned to run in December 1961 the event was postponed until 26 January 1962. From the following year the Australian Surfriders Association - ASA (Victorian Branch) - now called Surfing Victoria -hosted and staged the annual surfing competition at Bells Beach held at Easter each year. The ASA also ran the conservation contest at Bells Beach which included tree planting in an effort to help preserve natural values every year since the mid-1970s.

Surfing competitions
 Rip Curl GromSearch National Series (under 17s) 
 Rip Curl Pro every Easter since 1962

Surfers Appreciating the Natural Environment (SANE)
In 1988 a group of local surfers who were concerned about the human impact that tourism was having on the Bells Beach Surfing Reserve started a group called Surfers Appreciating the Natural Environment. Since 1988 they have met monthly to revegetate the reserve in an effort to bring it back to its original state. They have planted over 100,000 plants there to date.

In popular culture
Although the final scene of the film Point Break is set at Bells Beach, the scene was not filmed there. Bells Beach is a straight stretch and the beach in the film is a cove with spruce trees atop a hill. The actual location of the film was Indian Beach in Ecola State Park located in Cannon Beach, Oregon in the United States.

Bells Beach is visited in the 1966 documentary film The Endless Summer.

In the 2007 animation film Surf's Up, the Australian surfer is shown to be from Bells Beach.

References

External links
Bells Beach - Tourism site
Torquay,Jan Juc,Bells Beach Visitor Guide - JanJuc.com.au
Bells Beach Facebook community - www.facebook.com/bellsbeachtorquay

Towns in Victoria (Australia)
Surf Coast Shire
Coastal towns in Victoria (Australia)
Surfing locations in Victoria (Australia)
Beaches of Victoria (Australia)
Victorian Heritage Register